Savennes is a commune in the Puy-de-Dôme department in Auvergne in central France.

Geography
The Chavanon forms most of the commune's western border, then flows into the Dordogne.

See also
Communes of the Puy-de-Dôme department

References

Communes of Puy-de-Dôme